Achladochori (meaning "pear village", Krushevo) is a village and a former community in the Serres regional unit, Greece. Since the 2011 local government reform it is part of the municipality Sintiki, of which it is a municipal unit. The municipal unit has an area of 187.019 km2. Population 861 (2011).

Near Achladochori there was an ancient city (probably the city of Tristolos), whose ruins has been found on the hill "Gradista", located 4 km north-east of the village.

References

 

List of settlements in the Serres regional unit

Populated places in Serres (regional unit)